The Isle of Man Steam Packet Company Limited (abbreviated to IoMSPCo.) is the oldest continuously operating passenger shipping company in the world, having been founded in 1830.

The company provides freight, passenger and vehicle services between the Isle of Man Sea Terminal, in Douglas, Isle of Man, and four ports in the United Kingdom and Ireland. It is owned by the Isle of Man Government.

History

Beginning of the company
There had been various shipping companies serving the Isle of Man before the formation of this company in 1830, but their crossings were irregular and vessels used were unreliable. As a result, the island could be cut off for weeks at a time. The Manx people felt it was essential they should have their own dedicated service. A meeting was held in Douglas in 1829, from which was formed a committee charged investigating the cost of acquiring a steam packet.

On 30 June 1830, the forerunner of today's Isle of Man Steam Packet Company was born when the brand new vessel, built at a cost of £7,250, sailed from Douglas to Liverpool on its very first sailing. From the inauguration of the service until January 1832, the company was known as the Mona's Isle Company. Briefly the company then traded as the Isle of Man United Steam Packet, before assuming its present name in July 1832.

By the turn of the 20th century, the company was serving numerous ports in England, Wales, Scotland and Ireland. Ports served included Liverpool, Silloth, Whitehaven, Holyhead, Ardrossan, Blackpool, Belfast and Dublin.

War service
Vessels and crews of the company were actively involved in both the First and Second World Wars. One vessel, was attached to the British Grand Fleet and led the German High Seas Fleet into Scapa Flow in the Orkney Islands at the end of the First World War.

During the First World War, eleven out of a total fleet of fifteen Steam Packet ships were requisitioned by the Admiralty. Four of them were lost, three retained by the government and four returned to service.  and  also served as aircraft/seaplane carriers.

In the Second World War, ten of the fleet of sixteen ships were commandeered for active duty, four of which were lost. The Dunkirk evacuation was perhaps the company's finest hour, with Mona's Isle (IV) being the first to leave Dover and the first to complete the round trip during the evacuation. Eight company ships took part in this mission, rescuing a total of 24,699 British troops – one in fourteen of those evacuated from Dunkirk. However this was also the company's blackest day, as three of the line's ships were lost:

 , mined off Dunkirk on 29 May;
 , sunk by air attack whilst berthed alongside Dunkirk's East Pier on 29 May;
 , sustained heavy damage following several air attacks on 29 May, and sank off the beaches in the early hours of 30 May.

It is sited at Kallow Point in Port St Mary as a memorial to the company's crew who took part in the war.

Post-war service
Mona's Isle (VI) was the Steam Packet Company's first stern loader in 1984–85.

The 1980s were tough times for the company, with declining passenger numbers. Strong competition from Manx Line's   brought them close to collapse. In February 1985, they announced a merger with Sealink who had, by now, taken over Manx Line. The main UK port switched from Liverpool to Heysham, thus ending (albeit temporarily as it turned out) an association lasting back to the company's origins.

In 1996, the Steam Packet Company became a wholly owned subsidiary of Sea Containers headed by James Sherwood, who had pioneered the fast-craft operation. In July 2003, the company was sold for £142 million to Montagu Private Equity. In 2005, the company was purchased by Macquarie Bank for £225 million.

On 3 February 2007, Sea Express 1 (formerly SeaCat Isle of Man) collided with the cargo ship Alaska Rainbow in heavy fog in the River Mersey. None of the 294 passengers and crew was hurt, and the ferry was moored at Liverpool Pier Head while water was being pumped from the engine room, a number of cars remained on board. She was later towed to the Cammell Laird basin in Birkenhead where all cars remaining aboard were offloaded. On 14 March 2007, the Sea Express 1 was relaunched. In the meantime alternative service was provided by Ben-my-Chree to Birkenhead during the weekends. In December 2007, the vessel was renamed to become the sixth Snaefell.

In June 2007, a new CEO, Mark Woodward, was appointed to succeed Hamish Ross; he promised to improve the company's services, to return to the classic livery, and to promote the island's culture.

As the first part of the rebranding, the Sea Express 1 and SuperSeaCat Two were renamed Snaefell and Viking respectively; the latter was later sold and operated for the Atlantico Line as Hellenic Wind.

The fleet received a brand new livery, replacing the old SeaCo livery. All vessels of the fleet underwent complete internal refits which reflected the company's new colours and the rebranding of the company's on board lounges. The terminals received new signage and new uniforms were made for crew and shore staff.

The company's first class lounge and members club were renamed: 1st Lounge became the Premium Lounge and the Blue Riband Club became the Executive Club. The Quiet Lounge was also renamed, becoming the Niarbyl Reserved Lounge.

On 26 March 2010, while embarking passengers and loading vehicles at Heysham, England, the ro-ro passenger ferry Ben-my-Chree moved approximately eight metres (9 yards) along the quayside, causing serious damage to the passenger access structure.  The foot-passenger walkway detached at both ends and collapsed onto the quayside, and the gangway detached from the vessel's side shell door and was left hanging on a single rope. There were no injuries. Eight passengers were trapped in the gangway compartment of the shore structure and were later rescued by the local fire service.

On 1 November 2010, it was reported on the Isle of Man Newspapers website, that the Steam Packet had lost two major freight customers to rival company Mezeron who had just set up a new freight service between Douglas and Liverpool a week or so earlier. In February 2011 Mezeron withdrew the service citing lack of growth in the market. Previously the Steam Packet Company had reported a loss of 15% of its total freight business to Mezeron.

In April 2011, it was announced that the company had new owners Banco Espírito Santo. In May 2018, it was confirmed that the Isle of Man Government had agreed a deal worth £124 million to purchase 100% of MIOM Ltd, the parent company of the Isle of Man Steam Packet Company. The deal was approved by Tynwald on 16 May 2018.

In early 2013, Sea Alliance announced plans for a new shipping company to serve the Isle of Man.
The company planned to use a 32-year-old vessel Cometa. However the venture failed and nothing has been heard since.

Current services

In return for exclusive use of the government linkspan at Douglas, the Steam Packet Company has guaranteed regular services to the Manx government.  and  provide regular services to England and Ireland.

In addition to the regular routes, the company operates a few special day excursions to other destinations or round the Isle of Man in summer. Extra sailings are scheduled at times of high demand such as the Isle of Man TT period. The company also operates its own in-house travel agency, Steam Packet Holidays.

In August 2017, the company announced a consultation to switch sailings from Belfast to Larne, to allow sailings to carry freight, motorhomes and coaches which could not be loaded at Belfast's Albert Quay.

The Steam Packet Company operates services between:
 Douglas - Heysham (Year-round service)
 Douglas - Liverpool (Seasonal service - March to November)
 Douglas - Belfast (Seasonal service - April to September & Christmas)
 Douglas - Dublin (Seasonal service - April to September)

Film appearances
Steam Packet ships have been used in a number of films. The SS Mona's Queen is seen dockside in Liverpool in the 1935 George Formby comedy No Limit. In the Barbra Streisand film, Yentl the ship carrying emigrants to the United States at the end of the film is the Manxman.  The Manxman also appears in Chariots of Fire. The Ben-my-Chree [6] was used in 2004 as a double for an English Channel ferry in the film On a Clear Day. The Lady of Mann was also used in the 2004 film Mickybo and Me and also appears, in Dublin, in Alan Parker's movie "The Commitments".

Fleet
The company operates three vessels: a year-round conventional RO-PAX vessel, a fastcraft which operates seasonally, and a RO-RO freighter. The freighter is available for use when required, and is otherwise often on short-term charter to other operators throughout the year.

In August 2020, the company ordered a new ferry from South Korean shipbuilder Hyundai Mipo Dockyard to replace Ben-my-Chree upon delivery in 2023. The new ship is to be called . In September 2022 it was announced that Arrow had been purchased from Seatruck Ferries after being on long term charter.

Historic fleet

The company started with wooden paddle steamers, which soon gave way to the steel "screw" vessels. The "screw" vessels were superseded by turbine steamers, the first being the 1905 . The company then replaced the passenger-only steamers with side-loading car ferries, the first diesel car ferry being the 1972  (V). Fastcraft then became the next generation of vessels to operate for the company, the first being the SeaCat Isle of Man.

Pre-war steamers
The company built five steamers over ten years from 1927. They were the replacements for the various second-hand steamers that the company purchased to replace its First World War losses.

The "Six Sisters"
A class of vessel derived from pre-war steamers Fenella and Tynwald affectionately known as the Six Sisters. These were all built by Cammell Laird in Birkenhead and were in service between 1946 and 1982. They operated from Douglas to various ports. No two vessels were identical and all had their own (albeit minor) differences. The last vessel to be withdrawn was Manxman in 1982. At the time it was the last vessel of its type in service in the British Isles. Despite preservation attempts the vessel was finally scrapped in 2012.

Side-loading car ferries
The company developed a design of side-loading car ferries, with a spiral ramp at the stern. These could operate (as car ferries) from ports which were not equipped with linkspans. This design is still unique to the Isle of Man Steam Packet Company today. They operated from Douglas to various ports.

Roll-on/roll-off ferries
The company has operated a number of roll-on/roll-off passenger and freight ferries in its history, the pioneering vessel being the Peveril [IV] in 1981, in response to Manx Line's Manx Viking.

Fastcraft
The company has operated fastcraft since 1993.

See also

References

Notes

Bibliography

External links 
 
 
 Marine Accident Investigation Branch: report into the Sea Express 1 & Alaska Rainbow collision (September 2007)
 Picture postcards of Steam Packet vessels from 1830 to the present day
 Facebook
 Twitter

Ferry companies of the Isle of Man
Government-owned companies of the Isle of Man
Shipping companies of the Isle of Man
British companies established in 1830
Packet (sea transport)
1830 establishments in the Isle of Man
Transport companies established in 1830
History of Liverpool
Transport in Liverpool